The Seminole Soccer Complex is a dedicated soccer park that includes over eleven fields and a soccer-specific stadium, located in Sanford, Seminole County, Florida.  The facility is home to the Orlando City U-23 team (formerly known as the Central Florida Kraze).  It has been used by the Central Florida Krush, and the Lake Mary High School football team.

Address: 
1900 Seminole Soccer Loop
Sanford, FL 32771

References

Buildings and structures in Seminole County, Florida
Soccer venues in Florida
Sports venues in Greater Orlando
Orlando City U-23
1995 establishments in Florida
Sports venues completed in 1995
Sports complexes in Florida